Bettina Huber (born 7 September 1995) is a Liechtensteiner footballer who plays as a goalkeeper for FC Staad and the Liechtenstein national football team.

Career statistics

International

References

1995 births
Living people
Women's association football goalkeepers
Liechtenstein women's footballers
Liechtenstein women's international footballers